Baylar Hasan oghlu Eyyubov (born March 11, 1951) is a Colonel-General, the Chief of the Security Service of the President of the Republic of Azerbaijan. First Deputy Chief of the Special State Protection Service of the Republic of Azerbaijan (2003-2020).

Biography 
Baylar Eyyubov was born on March 10, 1951, in Shirazly village.

On September 20, 1993, Baylar Eyyubov was appointed Deputy Chief of the Main Security Department of the Supreme State Authorities and Management Bodies of the Republic of Azerbaijan. On June 2, 2003, Baylar Eyyubov was appointed First Deputy Chief of the Special State Protection Service of the Republic of Azerbaijan - Chief of the Security Service of the President of the Republic of Azerbaijan. Since March 16, 2020, B. Eyyubov has been the Chief of the Security Service of the President of the Republic of Azerbaijan.

Awards

References 

Living people
Recipients of the Sharaf Order
Recipients of the Azerbaijani Flag Order
1951 births